Lucius Seius Herennius Sallustius (died 227 AD) was a Roman usurper in 227. He was a son of Seius (b. ca 155) and his wife Herennia Orbiana (b. ca 160), and paternal grandson of Publius Seius Fuscianus.

Sallustius was father-in-law to Severus Alexander and was raised to the rank of Caesar probably when his daughter, Sallustia Orbiana, was wed to the emperor in 225. He made an attempt on the life of his son-in-law and as a result was executed two years later. His daughter was banished to Libya.

References
 Benario, Herbert W., "Alexander Severus (A.D. 222-235)", De Imperatoribus Romanis
 Herodian 6.1.9-10

227 deaths
Crisis of the Third Century
3rd-century Roman usurpers
Year of birth unknown
Sallustii
Seii (Romans)